{{DISPLAYTITLE:C2H3NS}}
The molecular formula C2H3NS (molar mass: 73.12 g/mol, exact mass: 72.9986 u) may refer to:

 Methyl isothiocyanate, organosulfur compound with the formula CH3N=C=S
 Methyl thiocyanate, organic compound with the formula CH3SCN